Sir Horace Charles Mules  (23 March 1856 – 9 April 1939) was a  British civil servant and colonial administrator. He served as Commissioner in Sind from 1903 to 1904.

Mules was born in Honiton, Devon, and was educated at Wellington College. He was knighted in the 1919 Birthday Honours. He died in London in 1939.

References

1856 births
1939 deaths
People from Honiton
English civil servants
People educated at Wellington College, Berkshire
Administrators in British India
Knights Bachelor
Companions of the Order of the Star of India
Officers of the Order of the British Empire
Members of the Royal Victorian Order